This is a partial list of public art in Montreal, Quebec, Canada.

Artworks

References

External links

Art Public Montréal
Pictures of historical monuments of Montreal
Plus Sculpter dans Montréal - more sculpture in Montreal

 
History of Montreal
Montreal
Montreal
Public art